Good News Awards are awarded annually to news media organizations with offices in the Upper Peninsula of Michigan, for specific examples of published media that "affirm the dignity of people, recognize and uphold universally-recognized human values, and uplift and nourish the human spirit."  The Good News Awards, and related Certificates of Merit, were given annually starting in 1998 for works in broadcasting, print or the web.  The awards were last given in 2015.

Categories 
The divisions and categories of Good News Awards changed over time; for the 2012 and 2013 award years there were four divisions for entry:
 Radio
 Television
 Written News, Daily
 Written News, other than Daily
The six categories in each division were:
 Straight News Story
 Feature Story
 Editorial
 Series
 Public Service Announcement (for Radio and Television) or Regular Column (for Written News)
 Program (for Radio and Television) or Photograph (for Written News)

Awards 
Submissions are for works from the previous calendar year, with at most one submission per category per media organization.  Submissions are made in February by an editor of the media organization, and Awards are formally to the media organization with credit given to the individual author(s) of the work.  Representatives and authors from the winning organizations have been invited to a luncheon and receive a plaque or certificate.  The media organization itself receives the award, which is an Upper Peninsula photograph or painting that combines light with evidence of peaceful human works.  In 2012, forty-six media professionals were recognized from among twenty Upper Peninsula media organizations that submitted entries.

Sponsorship 
Material receiving awards is expected to uphold values such as community, creativity, tolerance, justice, respect, compassion, perseverance, truth, faith, care for the environment or the dedication to excellence.  The awards have been sponsored annually by the religious leaders of the Evangelical Lutheran, Presbyterian, United Methodist, Catholic and Episcopal Churches in the Upper Peninsula region.  Although the sponsors have been religious organizations, the award criteria do not involve religious content and topics of award-winning material are generally secular.

References

American journalism awards
Influence of mass media
Community
Virtue